Carlota Ulloa (born 3 March 1944) is a Chilean hurdler. She competed in the women's 80 metres hurdles at the 1968 Summer Olympics. Ulloa finished fourth in the 80 metres hurdles at the 1967 Pan American Games.

References

1944 births
Living people
Athletes (track and field) at the 1967 Pan American Games
Pan American Games competitors for Chile
Athletes (track and field) at the 1968 Summer Olympics
Chilean female hurdlers
Olympic athletes of Chile
Sportspeople from Santiago